Badea (Passiflora quadrangularis) is a species of plant.

Badea may also refer to:

Romanian name 
 Alexandra Badea (born 1998), Romanian handballer
 Alexandru Badea (1938–1986), Romanian footballer
 Alin Badea (born 1988), Romanian sabre fencer
 Bela Badea, Romanian chess player
 Christian Badea (born 1947), Romanian-American opera and symphonic conductor
 Doina Badea (1940-1977), Romanian singer of popular music
 Ioana Badea (born 1964), Romanian rower 
 Ionuț Badea (born 1975), Romanian footballer and manager
 Liana Badea (born 1989), Romanian female volleyball player
 Mircea Badea (born 1974), Romanian satirist and media personality
 Pavel Badea (born 1967), Romanian footballer 
 Stelian Badea (born 1958), Romanian footballer
 Tony Badea (born 1974), Romanian-Canadian boxer
 Valentin Badea (born 1982), Romanian footballer
 Viorel Badea (born 1968), Romanian politician
 Badea Cârțan, nickname of Gheorghe Cârțan (1849–1911), Romanian shepherd and independence fighter

Other uses
 Arab Bank for Economic Development in Africa (Banque Arabe pour le Développement Economique en Afrique, BADEA)

See also 

 Badeau, a surname
 Badeaux, a surname

Romanian-language surnames